Awe is a 2018 Indian Telugu-language psychological cross genre film written and directed by Prasanth Varma (in his feature debut). It is produced by Nani and Prashanti Tipirneni under their maiden production house Wall Poster Cinema. The film features an ensemble cast of Kajal Aggarwal, Nithya Menen, Regina Cassandra, Eesha Rebba, Srinivas Avasarala, Priyadarshi Pullikonda and Murali Sharma. It also features the voices of Nani and Ravi Teja. Awe deals with psychological issues and social problems like child abuse, sexual abuse, and drug abuse. 

The film released worldwide on 16 February 2018 and received highly positive reviews from critics and audience. At the 66th National Film Awards, the film won the award for Best Special Effects, and Best Make-up.

Plot
Shiva is a watchman and an aspiring scientist who is building a time machine to meet his parents whom he hasn't met for years, when Parvathy, a woman, suddenly shows up and claims that she is his future-self and has traveled back in time to prevent their parents' death, which she claims will occur in an hour.

Nala is a down-on-his-luck man who applies to be a chef at a restaurant. While he does not even know how to cook, he just follows instructions in YouTube cooking videos to finish jobs given by the restaurant owner. While he's cooking, he befriends Nani, a goldfish and  Chanti, a bonsai tree in the kitchen, which both surprisingly can even talk and he is the only human that can hear, understand and communicate with them.

Radha is with her parents waiting for her partner, Krish. When Krish shows up, Radha's parents are surprised to see that Krish is a woman whose full name is Krishnaveni, and she and Radha are lesbian lovers. Radha's parents strongly object to Radha and Krish's relationship as they cannot accept same-sex marriage. However, Radha's parents are moved when Krish, a psychiatrist by profession, tells them that Radha hates men due to horrific incidents she faced in her childhood, which later prompted to change her sexual orientation towards women.

Moksha is an 8-year-old girl who works at her mother's restaurant and performs magic tricks to the customers. Yogi, an egoistic magician, visits her restaurant. He humiliates Moksha after watching her magic show but ends up being humiliated by someone claimed to be a magic master, who may actually be a soul or even God Himself.

Mira is a barista at a restaurant who is also a drug addict. She and her boyfriend Sugar are gearing up to loot a rich investor whom they expect to come to the restaurant soon. Mira accidentally finds a necklace inside a tree in the restaurant and wears it. She serves a regular customer Raghuram, whose wife, according to an old staff in the restaurant, was buried alive years ago under the tree where Mira found the necklace. Mira is frightened on seeing the ghost of Raghuram's wife.

A young unhappy woman named Kali prepares to shoot herself. She signs an organ donation document and a death note which reads, "I am going to conduct a mass murder, and I plead not guilty."

The above stories occur in parallel at the same restaurant.

Sugar conducts his plan to loot the investor but fails when his partner Mira is scared by the ghost. On being neither caught nor suspected, he sits naturally, waiting for another chance. Later, Moksha plays a magic trick for Sugar's target. Seeing this as a distraction, Sugar attempts to steal the money but is caught by the investor. The frustrated Sugar takes Moksha as a hostage to go away, only to bump into Yogi, who messes with him with magic tricks. Yogi and Krish try to seize control of Sugar's gun, but Radha is struck by a bullet when the gun goes off and she falls unconscious. A frantic Sugar attempts to run away, but is knocked down by Nala (encouraged by Nani) with a nearby stick. Krish and Radha's parents try to take Radha to the hospital, but Shiva and Parvathy prevent them with Sugar's gun, saying that if anyone leaves, their parents will die. It is implied by Parvathy, the future Shiva, that she had travelled back to this specific time numerous times to save her parents, with the time machine Shiva builds in the future. However, she fails every time because someone finally makes a way out of the restaurant one way or the other. Meanwhile, lights flicker and tremors occur in the restaurant with all inhabitants unable to get control of the situation.
 
In the end, it is revealed that Moksha, Radha, Mira, Nala, Shiva, Krish, Yogi and Parvathy are the multiple personalities of Kali herself, who suffers from multiple personality disorder and they reflect the various phases of her life. Kali shoots herself in the head to ease the burden she has been carrying in her mind, and simultaneously, all the virtual characters die with her.

Cast

Production
Nani met director Prasanth Varma who narrated the storyline to him. Nani reportedly loved the script and decided to produce the film himself. On 25 November 2017, the actor unveiled the title poster of the film at a star-studded event. The film was bankrolled by the actor's debut production house, Wallposter Cinema and co-produced by Prashanti Tipirneni, who worked as a costume designer for the Baahubali film series.

The film features an ensemble cast, which includes Kajal Aggarwal, Nithya Menen, Regina Cassandra, Eesha Rebba, Srinivas Avasarala, Murali Sharma, Priyadarshi Pullikonda, Rohini and Devadarshini. Nani voices a fish, who is the one of the two voice-over narrators while Ravi Teja was brought in to play as the second of the two voice-over narrators, featuring as the voice of a bonsai.

While Karthik Ghattamaneni, Sahi Suresh and Gautham Nerusu were reported to be the cinematographer, art director and editor respectively. Newcomer Mark K Robin was hired to compose the score and songs.

Themes 

The film deals with mental illness, abuse, gender and sexuality. Kali (played by Kajal Aggarwal), is the main protagonist who is suffering from multiple personality disorder, in the end of the film. MPD is a mental illness characterized by alternating between multiple personality states and memory loss.

The concept of lesbianism portrayed in the film, became a popular topic, since Telugu films were subjected to strict censor formalities, while portraying lesbianism in films. Affair is the first Telugu film to portray lesbianism. However, it did not have a theatrical release, since the CBFC refused to approve the film. It was directly released on YouTube. The film was withdrawn and sent back to the Censor Board. But later it was released uncut. The Supreme Court of India invalidated part of Section 377 of the Indian Penal Code making homosexuality legal in India in September 2018.

In an interview with Haricharan Pudipeddi of Hindustan Times, Nithya Menen stated that "When Prashant pitched the character, I was absolutely excited. As artistes, we come across many stories but something like Awe doesn't come often; it's rare. I didn't see it as a lesbian character. I accepted the offer because I thought it'd be exciting and challenging. I love doing different, edgy roles."

Music 
The film score and soundtrack were composed by newcomer Mark K Robin. Initially, the film features only one song titled "Theme of Awe" which was played in the opening and end credits of the film. The song was digitally released in YouTube and other streaming platforms on 9 February 2018, while it was launched at the Radio Mirchi FM Station in Hyderabad on 13 February 2018, in the presence of the film's cast and crew. Sung by Sharon, with lyrics written by Krishna Kanth, The Times of India stated that "The song is tailor made for the movie." Lahari Music released the opening credits and ending credits video on 30 June and 1 July respectively, which features the theme song. Both the videos were released on two different YouTube channels.

Marketing 
The pre-release event took place at B. R. Ambedkar University Grounds at Hyderabad on 31 January 2018, where the film's trailer was released and received positive responses.

Release and reception

Awe was released worldwide on 16 February 2018. The film was premiered exclusively in the United States, a day before its original release, on 15 February 2018.

Neetishta Nyayapati, from The Times of India, rated 4 out of 5 stars, and stated that "Go watch this film if you're looking for something definitely out of the box and fresh, ‘Awe’ will not disappoint you." The Indian Express gave it 4 stars stating that "Awe has high entertainment value, strong emotions, progressive characters, thrills, chills, comedy and some philosophy. Prasanth could have even made this film work without big actors or fancy sets in it." Hindustan Times rated the film 5/5, summarising that the film is "technically brilliant".

India Today rated 3 out of 5 stars, stating that "Awe has several astonishing moments only if you can look past the sequences that are not in sync with the story." Behindwoods rated 3 out of 5, stating it as "a welcome trendsetter" Deccan Chronicle rated 4 out of 5 stars, and summarised that "The narration is slow and be careful… If you do not understand the climax, you do not understand the film. The film's key point is the last 15 minutes in which the director very cleverly reveals the connection between the characters. Prashanth Varma has tried something different here. People, who are on the lookout for a new genre cinema, should watch this film definitely." Baradwaj Rangan of Film Companion South wrote "Awe certainly leaves you thinking – about the film itself, and about what an exciting time it is in Telugu cinema, with so many rebels plotting these little coups against one of the country's most deeply entrenched cinematic empires."

In a contrast review, Firstpost rated 3 out of 5 and stated that "The moment you figure out an answer, you will know whether Awe! is ‘Awesome’ or ‘Awful’. The truth lies somewhere in between." Indiaglitz rated 2.75/5, and gave a verdict: "AWE is a crafty anthology movie which relies too heavily on the strength of its climax. Too psychological, too poetic at times. The lengthiness of many scenes makes one say, 'It's more of the same'. Genre shifts were an oversold idea. The performances are praiseworthy. Technical departments put up a solid show." Sify rated 2.5 out of 5 stars, stating that "Awe is psychological thriller of a traumatized woman told in episodic stories. There are many individual episodes that are strangely funny but the overall drama seems too far-fetched. The final twist in the tale is unconvincing. Second half is mostly bore."

Legacy 
Celebrities such as actors Rahul Ravindran, Anupama Parameswaran, Adivi Sesh, Vennela Kishore, Shashank, director Madhura Sreedhar Reddy, producer Shobu Yarlagadda and costume designer Neeraja Kona , praised Nani and Prashanth Varma for the latter's scripting and direction and the former's production values. The film was presented at the World Congress of Psychiatry in Mexico, by an Indian medical student from the US who presented at the conference as "Dissociative Identity Disorder in Indian Cinema."

References

External links
 

2018 films
Hyperlink films
Films that won the Best Special Effects National Film Award
Indian nonlinear narrative films
Indian psychological thriller films
Films that won the National Film Award for Best Make-up
2018 directorial debut films
2018 LGBT-related films
Indian LGBT-related films
LGBT-related thriller films
Films directed by Prasanth Varma
Films about depression
Films about suicide
Films about child abuse
Films about sexual abuse
Films about drugs
Films about magic and magicians
2010s Telugu-language films